Dorshei Derekh is a Jewish prayer group ("minyan") at Germantown Jewish Centre in the Mt. Airy neighborhood of Philadelphia. Its name is Hebrew for "Seekers of a Way." The minyan is an affiliate of the Reconstructing Judaism.

Early history
The genesis of Dorshei Derekh goes back to the Germantown Minyan, started in 1974 by Rachel Falkove, Michael Masch, and others.  Shortly after its first meeting it moved to Germantown Jewish Centre (which is affiliated with the United Synagogue of Conservative Judaism).

Dorshei Derekh's participatory, lay-led services, largely in Hebrew and including Torah discussions involving personal reflections, were part of a national trend of havurot and minyanim as alternatives to formal synagogue services.

The minyan grew and attracted new residents to Mt. Airy.  Within a few years, the minyan had up to 100 participants and divided into several minyanim, one of which was more traditional and one more flexible.

After various changes and reorganizations, these two descendants of the Germantown Minyan formed minyanim that continue today.

The more traditional group, dubbed the “206 Minyan” after the room in which it davvened (prayed), changed rooms and renamed itself Minyan Masorti.

The other group, more open to liturgical creativity, met biweekly.  Some new members allied themselves with that minyan, and the combined group began meeting in the fall of 1986, settling on the name Dorshei Derekh.  This choice was clearly influenced by the Jerusalem congregation Mevakshei Derech, a Reconstructionist-influenced community that was then independent (more recently affiliated with the Progressive/Reform movement).

The Minyan Evolves
The minyan went through a number of key decisions.  One controversial issue in the mid-1990s was defining the role of non-Jewish family members and guests at services.  A more involved decision was to formally affiliate with the Reconstructionist movement.  This entailed defining minyan membership, establishing a formal decision-making process for controversial decisions, providing outside facilitators, and conducting discussions with Germantown Jewish Centre.  After a lengthy process, the minyan joined the Jewish Reconstructionist Federation (now Reconstructing Judaism) in 1999.

Perhaps the greatest change from the 1970s or early 1980s has been the re-imagination of the Germantown Jewish Centre as a “multi-minyan” congregation.  Dorshei Derekh is no longer viewed as “those other people” but as a key part of the congregation.  Many Germantown Jewish Centre committee chairs, officers, and board members have come from Dorshei Derekh, including three recent congregational presidents,  Helen Feinberg (2002-04), Rachel Falkove (2004-06), and Mitch Marcus (2012-14). In addition, minyan members are involved in education and social action projects with the wider congregation.

The minyan itself has constituted a caring community, providing meals and other support for members with illness and at times of loss or of births.  This support is based on community connection, not only on who is a close personal friend.  The minyan has always attempted to welcome newcomers, but the transient situations of many in our community have made that challenging. The minyan has encouraged people to acquire new liturgical and leadership skills.

There have always been considerable numbers of people in the minyan with substantial Jewish knowledge, enriching the community.  While many of these are Reconstructionist rabbis and rabbinical students, there are also very knowledgeable lay people. This has made it possible for many to take part in leading the group and in adding to the ideas in discussions.

Germantown Minyan members were part of a network of East Coast havurot that met several times a year from the early 1970s until 1981 at Weiss’ Farm in New Jersey and later at Fellowship Farm near Philadelphia.  These networks formed a basis for the National Havurah Committee, and numerous Dorshei Derekh members have participated in NHC events and leadership.  The minyan has organized its own in-town and out-of-town retreats a number of times, most recently in the fall of 2006.

Customs and Practice
Some practices inherited from the Germantown Minyan, or created in the early years, have influenced the minyan over two decades.  Other minhagim (customs) grew over the decades.  A few that are noteworthy include:

a)	Rotating leadership. The minyan coordinator (a chairperson) rotates every six months and with the past coordinator and coordinator-elect forms a three-person mazkirut (secretariat) for decisions that cannot wait.  In general, the minyan coordinator position is filled alternately by women and men.

b)	Participatory decision-making is maintained through quarterly minyan meetings, though attendance is not usually large.

Shabbat morning and festival services involve a number of key minhagim.  The minyan arranges its space in a circle or semicircle, which emphasizes community rather than a leader.

Services include a good deal of Hebrew, with English readings or interpretations sometimes added by a leader.  Pesukei dezimra (introductory psalms) with much singing are often emphasized.  The Amidah includes the matriarchs, and some participants phrase blessings in alternative or feminine Hebrew. At its Dec. 2, 2012 minyan meeting, Dorshei Derekh passed a proposal that allows service leaders to include Bilhah and Zilpah in the listing of the matriarchs, during the communal recitation of the Amidah.

The Torah reading is done on a triennial cycle, typically with three (rather than seven) aliyot.  A key part of the Torah service is the mi sheberakh blessings, as people volunteer for aliyot to mark events in their lives and receive recognition from the community: birthdays, new jobs, new academic ventures, arriving and departing for Israel, departing for college, a yahrzeit, a new apartment or home.  These combined Hebrew and English individual prayers are a way the minyan shares news and support.

While officially retaining it as an option, Dorshei Derekh generally omits the haftarah (prophetic reading) except for a few times a year.  (The monthly women’s haftarah project in the 1990s was an exception.) Its omission allows for a longer Torah discussion, which follows a d’var Torah. The minyan avoids centralized leadership in these discussions by having each speaker call on the next person.  For 20 years, speakers alternated between men and women to assure gender equality, until this practice was suspended as an experiment in the summer of 2006.  (If there were more women present than men, a step originated to advance women’s participation might actually limit it.)

The Musaf service at Dorshei Derekh is an additional reading, poem, or story rather than another service.

The service concludes with introductions, announcements, and a member-provided kiddush.  Occasionally a longer lunch and discussion follow services.

The minyan originally used the Conservative Silverman siddur with unwritten modifications, but after the Reconstructionist siddur Kol Haneshamah (edited by a minyan member, David Teutsch) was published in 1994, it was adopted by the minyan "as an experiment." That "experiment" continues today.

Dorshei Derekh celebrated its 25th anniversary on Dec. 9-10, 2011

References

External links
 Minyan Dorshei Derekh's page on the website of Germantown Jewish Centre
 Minyan Dorshei Derekh's own website and blog

Conservative synagogues in Pennsylvania
Reconstructionist synagogues in the United States